Moat is an English and Scottish surname. Notable people with the surname include:

 John Moat (1936–2014), British poet
 Raoul Moat (1973–2010), British perpetrator of the 2010 Northumbria Police manhunt
 Richard Moat (born 1954), British businessman 
 William Pollock Moat (1827–1895), New Zealand politician

Scottish surnames
English-language surnames